Alfred Richardson may refer to:

 Alfred Richardson (cricketer) (1875–1935), English schoolmaster and cricketer
 Alfred Richardson (politician) (1837–1872), member of the Georgia Assembly in the U.S. State of Georgia
 Alfred Richardson (footballer) (1878–1951), Australian rules footballer
 Alfred Herbert Richardson (1874–1951), English policeman